Miomaci (Latinized , abbreviation of "Miocene" +  "little bear") is a genus of herbivorous ailuropodine bear from the late Miocene of Hungary. It is known only from teeth and jaws, but these indicate it was significantly smaller than its close relative Indarctos, which could reach 265.74 kg.

Discovery and Naming
Miomaci is known from dental remains of one individual including a left maxilla with P3-M2, left upper canine, 2 left incisors, right M1, right M2, right p1, fragment of right mandible with p3-m1, left hemimandible with alveoli with p1-p4, m1 (separated), m2-m3. The material is stored in the Geological Museum of the Geological and Geophysical Institute of Hungary. The specimens are known from the Edelény Formation near the town of Rudabánya, Hungary and date to the Vallesian age of the late Miocene.

The generic name is derived from 'Miocene' and 'Maci, the Hungarian word for 'little bear' or 'teddy bear'. The specific name, pannonicum, is Latin for 'comes from Pannonia', the Roman province in which Rudabánya is located.

References

Miocene bears
Miocene mammals of Europe
Prehistoric carnivoran genera